Peter Gerard Trower (25 August 1930 – 10 November 2017) was a Canadian poet and novelist.

Trower was born in St Leonards-on-Sea, England, and came to Canada in 1940. He worked for 22 years as a logger and has been writing professionally since 1971.

Trower published three novels, more than ten books of poetry and numerous articles. One of his novels, Grogan's Cafe (novel), is in pre-production for a film 

In 1976, Trower was the subject of a CBC documentary titled Between the Sky and the Splinters, after his 1974 book of poetry of the same name.

Bibliography

Poetry
Moving Through the Mystery - Talonbooks - 1969
Between the Sky and the Splinters - Harbour - 1974
The Alders and Others - Harbour - 1976
Ragged Horizons - McClelland & Stewart - 1978
Bush Poems - Harbour - 1978
Goose quill Snags - Harbour - 1982
The Slidingback Hills - Oberon - 1986
Unmarked Doorways - Harbour - 1989
Where Roads Lead - Reference West - 1994
Hitting the Bricks - Ekstasis - 1997
Chainsaws in the Cathedral - Ekstasis - 1999
A Ship Called Destiny - Ekstasis - 2000
There Are Many Ways - Ekstasis - 2002
Haunted Hills and Hanging Valleys: Selected Poems 1969-2004 - Harbour - 2004

Prose
Rough and Ready Times - Glassford - 1993
Grogan's Cafe - Harbour - 1993
Dead Man's Ticket - Harbour - 1996
The Judas Hills - Harbour - 2000
Hellhound on his Trail & other stories - Ekstasis - 2008

Editor
Witches and Idiots
Raincoast Chronicles

Anthology contributions
Best Poems - 1967
West Coast Seen
Kites and Cartwheels
Listen
Skookum Wa Wa
Storm Warning 2
Raincoast Chronicles First Five
A Government Job at Last
Western Windows
Who Owns the Earth
Assault on the Worker
Poems for a Snow-eyed Country
For Openers
Going for Coffee
Raincoast Chronicles Six/Ten
British Columbia/A Celebration
Soul of a City
Vancouver Poetry
Vancouver and its Writers
Strong Voices
Paperwork
Oberon Poetry
Vancouver
Songs from the Wild
Because You Loved Being a Stranger
Witness to Wilderness
Raincoast Chronicles Eleven Up
Earle Birney - A Tribute

Periodical contributions
Poetry (Chicago)
Poetry Australia
Prism International
West Coast Review
This Magazine
Canadian Poetry Magazine
Vancouver Magazine
West World
Equity
Western Living
Raincoast Chronicles
The Georgia Straight
Sunshine Coast News
Business Logger
B. C. Studies

Discography
Sidewalks & Sidehills - 2003
Kisses In the Whiskey - 2004

Projects in Progress
 Way Stations (Selected Prose)
 The Counting House (Short stories centered on Oakalla Prison)
 Holy Herb - Master Cracksman (Semi-fictionalized biography)
 Rainbow's End Horizons (Travel pieces)
 Booking In (Selected book and film reviews)
 Reluctant Brush Ape (Autobiographical logging pieces)
 The Gathering (Poems new, revised and uncollected)

References

 W.H. New, ed. The Encyclopedia of Canadian Literature. Toronto: University of Toronto, 2002. 1138

External links
 Official Website: http://www.petertrower.com
 More on Peter Trower from Harbour Publishing
 Winner George Woodcock Award 2002
 Review at ArcPoetry
Records of Peter Trower are held by Simon Fraser University's Special Collections and Rare Books

1930 births
2017 deaths
20th-century Canadian poets
Canadian male poets
Canadian people of English descent
Canadian male novelists
20th-century Canadian male writers
People from Hastings